The Aru tree frog (Ranoidea aruensis) is a species of frog in the subfamily Pelodryadinae.
It is endemic to Indonesia.
Its natural habitats are subtropical or tropical moist lowland forests and subtropical or tropical swamps.
It was originally described on Aru Islands and Misool and may only exist here; it may also exist on Papua although this is not confirmed. It is threatened by habitat destruction by logging and agriculture.

References
 

Ranoidea (genus)
Amphibians described in 1883
Taxonomy articles created by Polbot
Taxobox binomials not recognized by IUCN